Narayan Shridhar Bendre (21 August 1910 – 19 February 1992) was a 20th-century Indian artist and one of the founder members of Baroda Group Narayan Shridhar Bendre was born in Indore.  He made a name for himself as a landscape artist. In 1992 he was awarded the Padma Bhushan.

Life and career

Narayan Shridhar Bendre was born in a Deshastha Rigvedi Brahmin family on 21 August 1910 in Indore, Madhya Pradesh. He was initially trained in the State Art School there prior to taking the Government Diploma in Art from Bombay in 1933. His initial interests were conditioned by the quasi-modernist landscape painting as practised in the Indore School at the beginning of the 20th century. An avid traveller, Bendre continued to paint the landscape throughout his career, often with different stylistic means. Early recognition came with the Silver Medal from the Bombay Art Society in 1934, followed by the then ultimate honour of the gold medal in 1941. Part of 1945 was spent as artist-in-residence at Santiniketan, where he met Nandalal Bose, Ram Kinkar Baij and Binode Behari Mukherjee. He also met Jamini Roy in Calcutta. Bendre's early work has been classified as being academic and impressionist, dominant subjects being the landscape and the portrait, in oils and gouache.

Bendre was back in Bombay in 1947, from where he left in June for the United States, holding a solo exhibition at the Windermere Gallery, New York, in 1948. On his way back to India, he travelled through Europe, gaining exposure to original works of the modernist masters. An independent nation and an art scene animated by the adventure of the Progressive Artists Group greeted his return in March 1948.

In 1950, Bendre moved to Baroda as the first Reader and Head of the Department of Painting at the Faculty of Fine Arts. He remained there until 1966, becoming Dean of the Faculty in 1959. He was instrumental in laying the foundations of the new programme at the Faculty. It was here that he embarked upon a phase held as his most important, which involved experiments with Cubist, Expressionist and abstract tendencies, producing such works as Thorn (1955, National Award)', Sunflowers, The Parrot and the Chameleon, which give evidence of his shifting allegiances to currents in mainstream European modernism, and his endeavour to marry these with Indian formal and thematic considerations.

Travels continued, within India and internationally: he visited West Asia and London in 1958, the US and Japan in 1962. The adventure of modernism that Bendre carried from Bombay to Baroda bore fruit in the formation of the Baroda Group of artists in 1956. Along with Bendre, several of the first generation of his students at Baroda were members of the Group, which held regular shows in Bombay, Ahmedabad and Baroda, providing wide exposure to work being produced at the new art school.

After he resigned from Baroda in 1966, Bendre experimented with his version of pointillism and held shows in Bombay every alternate year. He was awarded the Padma Shri in 1969. He was elected to chair the International Jury at the Second Triennale in New Delhi in 1971 and as fellow of the Lalit Kala Academi in 1974. His career was recognised further with a retrospective exhibition at the Lalit kala Academi in 1974, the Aban-Gagan Award from Viswa Bharati University in 1984, and the Kalidas Samman in 1984.

He continued to paint until his death on 18 February 1992.

Awards and honours
In 1955, Bendre received the National Award from the Lalit Kala Akademi for his work, Thorn. In 1969, he received the Padma Shri award and in 1992, he received the Padma Bhushan award. In 1974, he received the fellowship of the Lalit Kala Akademi. In 1984, the Visva Bharati University conferred him the Aban-Gagan Award and Madhya Pradesh state government conferred him the Kalidas Samman (1986–87).

Style
He is well known as the supreme landscapist, a composer and master of colours. He was immensely influenced by miniature painting. He visited the United States, England, France and Belgium in 1947–48. It was during the visit that he studied and imbibed modern art. Assimilating this western influence he created a niche for himself in the field of art by innovating a style all his own. He successfully carried out innovative experiments depicting subtle themes ranging from everyday life to the abstract. He never believed in restricting his imagination to the rigid framework of colour, line or form.

Notable works
Hairdo (1949), "The Sunflower" (1955), "Monkey" (1957), "The Cow and the Calf" (1948), "The Female Cowherd" (1956), "Homebound", "The Bullock Cart" and "Gossip"

Students
Some of his students were Balkrishna Patel, Ghulam Rasool Santosh, Gulam Mohammed Sheikh, Haku Shah, Jayant Parikh, Jyoti Bhatt, Kamudben Patel, Naina Dalal, Shri Ranjitsinh Pratapsinh Gaekwad, Ratan Parimoo, Shanti Dave, Triloke Kaul.

See also

References

External links

Narayan Shridhar Bendre Artworks and Public Auction Prices and Economic Data
N S Bendre Profile,Interview and Artworks
Artist Profile

People from Vadodara
Recipients of the Padma Shri in arts
Artists from Indore
1910 births
1992 deaths
Academic staff of Maharaja Sayajirao University of Baroda
Fellows of the Lalit Kala Akademi
Recipients of the Padma Bhushan in arts
Indian portrait painters
20th-century Indian painters
Indian male painters
Painters from Madhya Pradesh
20th-century Indian male artists